Marilena Kirchner (born 10 July 1997), also known as simply Marilena, is a German volksmusik and schlager singer.

Career 
On 7 May 2011, Marilena represented Germany with the song "A Lausbua muass er sei" at the young talent competition held in Croatia by Andy Borg's volksmusik television show  Musikantenstadl and won with over 58% of the popular vote.

In the summer of 2011, she released her first album, titled Ich bin wie ich bin.

The Herbert Roth Prize was a prestigious award that annually recognized young volksmusik artists.

On 31 December 2011, Marilena won the Young Talent Award given out annually at Silvesterstadl, a special New Year's Eve edition of  Musikantenstadl.

As of early 2018, Marilena's latest album is Hey DJ leg a Polka auf!, issued in the summer of 2014. A new album is in the works.

In 2019, after she graduated in Paderborn University with a degree in music, she started to work as a radio editor in Antenne Bayern de.

Style 
Marilena plays piano and guitar. Her role models are Stefanie Hertel and Helene Fischer.

Discography

Albums 
 2011: Ich bin wie ich bin
 2013: Lust auf's Leben
 2014: Hey DJ leg a Polka auf!

Singles 

 2009: Der erste Kuss
 2012: Bin ich noch Kind
 2012: Dann macht es bumm-bumm-bumm
 2013: Du bist mei Sommer
 2021: Hey DJ, leg a Polka auf! (Kloß mit Soß Remix)
 2022: Berghoamat

References

External links 
 

1997 births
Schlager musicians
Living people
21st-century German women singers